Russia–Venezuela relations include cooperation between Russia and Venezuela in areas of common concern, such as their common status as oil exporters, and policy toward the United States.  Venezuela is Russia's most important trading and military ally in Latin America. Russia recognizes Nicolás Maduro as the president of Venezuela, instead of Juan Guaidó, in the Venezuelan presidential crisis.

Background

The Soviet Union established diplomatic relations with Venezuela on March 3, 1945.  In 1952, during the dictatorship of Marcos Pérez Jiménez, Venezuelan security police apprehended and deported suspected Russian spies, which caused bitter protests back and forth between the two countries, leading to Venezuela breaking off relations with the Soviets on June 13, 1952. The relations were restored on April 16, 1970.

Chávez era
Under President Hugo Chávez, Venezuela enjoyed warm relations with Russia. Much of this was through the sale of military equipment; from 2005, Venezuela purchased more than $4 billion worth of arms from Russia. In September 2008, Russia sent Tupolev Tu-160 bombers to Venezuela to carry out training flights. In November 2008, both countries held a joint naval exercise in the Caribbean.  Following Chavez's two visits to Moscow in July and September 2008, Russian Deputy Prime Minister Igor Sechin arrived in Venezuela to pave the way for a third meeting within five months between their two presidents.

In November 2008, Venezuela and Russia discussed 46 potential cooperation agreements during an intergovernmental commission. Venezuelan Vice President Ramón Carrizales and Sechin reviewed a series of initiatives that Chavez and Russian President Dimitri Medvedev would sign later in the month. Venezuelan Foreign Minister Nicolás Maduro added to aggressive foreign policy initiatives sought by Chavez in saying that "the unipolar world is collapsing and finishing in all aspects, and the alliance with Russia is part of that effort to build a multipolar world." The two countries discussed the creation of a bi-national investment bank, the opening of a direct air route between Caracas and Moscow, the building of an aluminum plant, the construction of a gas platform off the Venezuelan coast, plans for automobile production, and Venezuela's acquisition of Russian planes and ships. While the two countries also reached agreements on the development of outer space and the use of nuclear energy. Maduro added that the two countries "will develop all what has to do with technology and satellite in the space", while still continuing to work at using nuclear energy with peaceful means to generate alternative energy.

Venezuela sought to develop mines at its largest gold deposits with help from Russia. Venezuelan Mining Minister, Rodolfo Sanz, told a Russian delegation that a memorandum of understanding would be signed with the Russian-owned Rusoro to operate the Las Cristinas and Brisas mine projects with the Venezuelan government. The former, one of Latin America's largest gold projects, was under contract to Canada's Crystallex, which had waited in vain for years for an environmental license to start mining. The minister, however, said the government was taking control of the mine to start work in 2009.

Further ties were in the offing when Chavez said an agreement for the Humberto Fernández-Morán Nuclear Facility would be signed upon Russian President Medvedev's visit to Venezuela accompanied by a Russian fleet of warships in mid-November 2008. Chavez also revealed that Russian nuclear technicians were already at work in Venezuela.

As a Russian flotilla, including the nuclear-powered warship Peter the Great, was on its way to the Caribbean for naval exercises with Venezuela, analysts saw the move as a geopolitical response to US support for Georgia following the 2008 South Ossetia War. Russian fighter jets have also been sold to Venezuela, while Caracas bought 100,000 AK-103 assault rifles to replace outdated FN FAL rifles for its military. However, the Russian Deputy Foreign Minister, Sergei Ryabkov downplayed the relevance of such moves "It looks like everyone has been accustomed for a long time to our warships being in naval bases and our warplanes in hangars, and thinking it will be like that forever", Ryabkov stated.

In September 2009 Russia approved a $2 billion loan to Venezuela.

2010 by agreement between the Fund of Housing at the mayor of Moscow and the Ministry of Housing Venezuela Russian contractors taking part in the "Great Housing Mission" for the construction of a typical panel housing. According to 13stroy.ru, they built about 10 thousand apartments in tenement houses. The project involves not only the construction of housing and infrastructure, but also the organization of nine joint ventures for the production of building materials.

In October, 2010, Chavez visited Russia where he signed a deal to build Venezuela's first nuclear power plant as well as buy $1.6 billion worth of oil assets.

On 6 October 2011, Russian Deputy Prime Minister Igor Sechin rushed to Caracas to get Chavez to commit to a $4 billion loan to purchase Russian weapons. And for 2011, Venezuela was the top customer for Russia's arms for ground forces.

Maduro era
Hugo Chávez died in March 2013. A special presidential election was held in April, which was won by Chávez's vice president, Nicolás Maduro.

In July 2017, during the crisis in Venezuela, in an article of Russia's Military-Industrial Courier, a journal popular with military officers of the Russian Armed Forces, in the event of a Venezuelan civil war, it was recommended that the Russian government provide military intelligence to the Bolivarian government, establish alliances with ALBA and to assist proxy leftist militant forces, such as colectivos, to maintain the Bolivarian government's power.

Maduro was re-elected for a second term in May 2018, but the result was denounced as fraudulent by most neighboring countries, the European Union, Canada and the United States. Russia, however, recognized the elections and Russian president Vladimir Putin congratulated Maduro.

In December 2018, Russia sent two Tupolev Tu-160 bombers to Venezuela. These jets are capable of carrying nuclear weapons. The Russian and Venezuelan militaries later conducted joint military exercises.

In January 2019, the majority opposition National Assembly declared that Maduro's reelection was invalid and declared its president, Juan Guaidó, to be acting president of Venezuela. The United States, Canada, Brazil and several Latin American countries recognized Guaidó as interim president. Russia, however, continued to support Maduro. A month later, Russia, along with China vetoed a United Nations Security Council resolution calling for new presidential elections in Venezuela.

In January 2020, Russia congratulated the election of Luis Parra as the next president of the National Assembly. The Russian Foreign Ministry said that the election contributes to the return of the intra-Venezuelan political struggle to the constitutional field that will find a peaceful exit to the ongoing crisis. In response, opposition deputies denounced that Russia looked after supporting Parra to improve its businesses in Venezuela, including to increase the Russian shareholder participation in oil contracts and other mining concessions that need the approval of the National Assembly and that it would not have with Guaidó.

In February 2022, Russia launched an invasion of Ukraine. The invasion received widespread international condemnation; Maduro, however expressed his "strong support" for Russia in a phone call with Putin and condemned the sanctions Western nations imposed on Russia.

According to CNBC, Russia's "most prominent" Latin American relationship is with Venezuela. Conversely, Venezuela's primary geopolitical ally is Russia.

Resident diplomatic missions

 Russia has an embassy in Caracas.
 Venezuela has an embassy in Moscow.

See also

Russians in Venezuela

References

External links

 Embassy of the Russian Federation in Caracas

 
Venezuela
Bilateral relations of Venezuela